The Cutting Edge is a live album by jazz saxophonist Sonny Rollins, recorded at the Montreux Jazz Festival and released on the Milestone label in 1974, featuring performances by Rollins with Stanley Cowell, Yoshiaki Masuo, Bob Cranshaw, David Lee and Mtume with Rufus Harley joining on one track.

Reception

The Allmusic review by Scott Yanow states: "Sonny Rollins' 1974 appearance at the Montreux Jazz Festival was warmly received... Rollins manages to turn such unlikely material as 'To a Wild Rose' and 'A House Is Not a Home' into jazz." Music critic Robert Christgau gave the album a B rating, writing "...although I hoped for belated paydirt from his first live album in years, more careful examination reveals that the straight melodies do get dull and the improvisations aren't rich enough to invite deep digging..."

Track listing
All compositions by Sonny Rollins except where noted.
 "The Cutting Edge" – 6:50  
 "To a Wild Rose" (Edward MacDowell) – 8:42  
 "First Moves" – 6:58  
 "A House Is Not a Home" – (Burt Bacharach, Hal David) – 5:33  
 "Swing Low, Sweet Chariot" (Traditional) – 14:41  
Recorded at the Montreux Jazz Festival, Switzerland, on July 6, 1974

Personnel
Sonny Rollins – tenor saxophone
Stanley Cowell – piano
Yoshiaki Masuo – guitar 
Bob Cranshaw – electric bass
David Lee – drums 
Mtume – congas
Rufus Harley – bagpipes (track 5)

References

Albums produced by Orrin Keepnews
1974 live albums
Sonny Rollins live albums
Milestone Records live albums
Albums recorded at the Montreux Jazz Festival